The following are notable Indian film music directors:

See also
 Bollywood content lists

References

Bollywood-related lists
Music directors
Film music directors